NewBay Media, LLC was a magazine and website publisher founded in 2006 and headquartered in New York City.

NewBay Media served five marketplaces — Music, Pro Audio/AV, Video & Broadcast, Consumer Electronics, and Education.

In April 2018, Future plc acquired NewBay for $13.8 million.

Acquisitions
In September 2006, NewBay Media (as an affiliate of The Wicks Group of Companies) acquired CMP Entertainment Media (Including Music Player Network, formerly Miller Freeman Music) from United Business Media which yielded Guitar Player, Bass Player, Keyboard, Pro Sound News, Systems Contractor News, Residential Systems, Videography, Government Video, DV, Technology & Learning, and Television Broadcast.

In 2007, NewBay Media acquired IMAS Publishing which yielded TV Technology, Radio World, Pro Audio Review, Audio Media, and some regional editions.

In 2009, Reed Business Information sold TWICE, Broadcasting & Cable, and Multichannel News to NewBay Media.

In early 2011, NewBay Media announced that it had acquired Mix, Electronic Musician, Radio, and Sound & Video Contractor magazines from Penton Media.

In 2012, NewBay Media bought the Music division of Future US.

In late 2012, NewBay Media acquired U.K.-based Intent Media (which was originally formed from the purchase of IP from United Business Media), including brands such as Music Week, PSNEurope, TVBEurope, MCV, Installation, and ToyNews. NewBay Media wanted to acquire these brands because of their strong market positioning and their historical links to the United Business Media purchases, as Pro Sound News was, prior to the spin off from UBM, sister magazine to PSNEurope (or Pro Sound News Europe).

In 2017, NewBay Media sold Revolver to Project Group M LLC.

In 2018, Future reacquired majority of the assets previously sold to NewBay Media by buying NewBay Media outright for US13.8 million.

Publications

 Audio Media International
 Audio Pro
 AV Technology
 AV-iQ
 Bass Player
 Bike Biz
 Broadcasting & Cable
 Develop
 Digital Signage
 Digital Video, digital video
 Electronic Musician
 Government Video
 Guitar Aficionado
 Guitar Player
 Guitar World
 Installation
 Keyboard Magazine
 Licensing.biz
 MCV
 MI World
 Mix
 Mobile Entertainment
 Multichannel News
 Music Week
 Pro Audio Review, professional audio
 ProSoundNews, professional audio
 PSNEurope
 Residential Systems
 Radio
 Radio World
 Rental & Staging
 
 School CIO
 Sound & Video Contractor
 Systems Contractor News
 Tech & Learning
 Toy News
 TVBEurope
 TV Technology
 TWICE
 Videography, videography

References

Publishing companies established in 2006
Magazine publishing companies of the United States
2018 mergers and acquisitions
Publishing companies disestablished in 2018
Defunct companies based in New York City